The year 2011 is the 10th year in the history of the Maximum Fighting Championship, a mixed martial arts promotion based in Canada. In 2011 Maximum Fighting Championship held 4 events beginning with, MFC 28: Supremacy.

Title fights

Events list

MFC 28: Supremacy 

MFC 28: Supremacy was an event held on February 25, 2011 at the River Cree Resort and Casino in Edmonton, Alberta.

Results

MFC 29: Conquer 

MFC 29: Conquer was an event held on April 8, 2011 at the Colosseum at Caesars Windsor in Windsor, Ontario.

Results

MFC 30: Up Close & Personal 

MFC 30: Up Close & Personal was an event held on June 10, 2011 at the Mayfield Inn Trade and Conference Centre in Edmonton, Alberta.

Results

MFC 31: The Rundown 

MFC 31: The Rundown was an event held on October 7, 2011 at the Mayfield Inn Trade and Conference Centre in Edmonton, Alberta.

Results

See also 
 List of Maximum Fighting Championship events

References 

Maximum Fighting Championship events
2011 in mixed martial arts
Events in Edmonton